Dragu is commune in Romania.

Dragu also may refer to:
 Dragu (river), tributary of the Almaș in Sălaj County, Romania

See also 
 Drăguș
 Drăgușeni (disambiguation)
 Drăgan (disambiguation)